Warren Daniel  is an American politician who has served in the North Carolina Senate since 2011.  He is a graduate of Freedom High School and the United States Military Academy.

References

External links

|-

1968 births
Living people
Republican Party North Carolina state senators
People from Morganton, North Carolina
21st-century American politicians